Do Not Disturb (originally New Terminal Hotel) is an American horror thriller film written and directed by BC Furtney. The film was originally released on March 23, 2010 as New Terminal Hotel but was edited for an August 6, 2013 DVD release through Image Entertainment as Do Not Disturb. The movie stars Stephen Geoffreys as a man out to get revenge for the death of his girlfriend. The film is also known for being one of the last film performances of actor Corey Haim before his death in 2010.

Plot
When his girlfriend gets murdered, Don Malek sets out to seek revenge from the people that brought about her death.

Cast
Stephen Geoffreys as Donald Malek
Ezra Buzzington as Spitz
Anthony Colliano as Stanley Glissberg
Robert DiDonato as Detective Dom Turkovich
James Grabowski as Carter Ball
Corey Haim as Jasper Crash
Tiffany Shepis as Ava Collins
Laura Hofrichter as Katherin (as Laura Leigh)
Sam Nicotero as DiAngelo
Tara Sukustis as Rebecca
Jeremy Moon as Waiter
Danielle Fortwangler as Hooker

Production
Furtney originally began working on the movie under the title New Terminal Hotel. The movie was filmed in Washington, Pennsylvania in the George Washington Hotel. The movie's filming received some media attention as Furtney's hotel room set at the George Washington Hotel was mistaken for the scene of a crime. New Terminal Hotel received a soft release in 2010, but did not receive much reception.

Film rights for the movie were later picked up by Image Entertainment and distributed under the name Do Not Disturb. Furtney removed "about 15 minutes" of footage from the film, which he felt strengthened the movie.

Reception
Critical reception for Do Not Disturb was mixed to negative. HorrorNews.net gave a mixed review, stating that it was "an odd little movie but despite its oddness and its laid back atmosphere it’s an effective movie." Ain't It Cool News gave a more positive review, remarking that while "story itself meanders a bit, and I must admit I was bored by the time the last act comes around" that "some decent and quizzical performances make it one of those films that should be seen if only for its odd nature". Shock Till You Drop heavily criticized the film, saying that "Watching it made me feel like an unwilling participant in someone else’s extremely depressing crack-induced nightmare".

References

External links
 

2010 films
Films shot in Pennsylvania
2010 horror thriller films
American horror thriller films
2010s English-language films
2010s American films